Are We There Yet? is a 2005 American family road comedy film directed by Brian Levant. It was written by Steven Gary Banks, Claudia Grazioso, J. David Stem, and David N. Weiss based on a story by Banks and Grazioso. Ice Cube stars alongside Nia Long, Aleisha Allen, Philip Daniel Bolden, Jay Mohr, and Tracy Morgan.

Produced by Revolution Studios and distributed by Columbia Pictures, the film was released theatrically on January 21, 2005. The film grossed $98 million worldwide and sold 3.7 million DVDs. A sequel (and remake of Mr. Blandings Builds His Dream House), Are We Done Yet?, was released in April 2007, and a television series featuring the film's main characters premiered in June 2010 on TBS.

Plot

Two rebellious children, Lindsey and Kevin Kingston, sabotage the relationships of their divorced mother, determined to keep her single until their parents reconcile. Meanwhile, Nick Persons, a bachelor who dislikes children, purchases a brand new car and boasts with his beloved bobblehead doll of Satchel Paige who comes to life at its own will though only Nick can hear him. After reaching his sports shop, he witnesses the woman of his dreams, Suzanne Kingston. On his way to talk to her, he is disgusted to find she has two kids, who turn out to be Lindsey and Kevin. Later that night, Nick runs into Suzanne and agrees to take her home. On New Year's Eve, he brings her to the local airport to go to Vancouver for a business meeting, but her former husband Frank calls to say he is sick and cannot bring the children to the airport, leaving her to put her trust in Nick.

Once at her house, he meets Kevin and Lindsey for the second time. The three go to the airport, and Kevin accidentally damages Nick's car door. Later, Kevin learns that corkscrews, a gift he got from Nick, are illegal to bring on planes. Unable to get to a trashcan, he slips the item in Nick's jacket pocket, which leads to Nick being tackled by security. They decide to take a train, but the two kids jump off to collect a cape from a toy just as Nick boards, forcing him to jump off and lose their luggage. They then decide to drive.

Believing Nick is only their mother's friend, the kids are tamed but still continue to misbehave. Overhearing a phone call, the two learn that Nick not only hates them, but also lied about not having feelings for their mother. Kevin fakes an asthma attack to lock Nick out of the car. Lindsey then tries to drive the car away, but fails, forcing Nick to chase after them and trying to get in from the SUV’s rooftop. Lindsey drives the car in a butcher statue, causing the axe to injure Nick in his testicles. Later, Lindsey signals to truck driver Al Buck who believes that they have been kidnapped, causing Nick to accidentally drive his car into the woods and down a mountain, resulting in heavy damage to the car. Ultimately, the kids run away to visit their father in a train with Nick pursuing them on a horse until he falls off. 

Once they arrive at their father's house, the kids discover he has started another family. Feeling betrayed and forgotten, they begin warming up to Nick, as he does with them, when Nick tells them his father also abandoned him. While beginning to become friends, they continue their journey on the road, but still find themselves facing various mishaps on the way. Eventually, Kevin vomits on the car's windshield after he ate too much sugar. While Kevin and Nick feed a deer some cookies, Lindsey accidentally scares it with a camera flash, causing the deer to attack Nick, resulting in him losing his car keys. Because of this, Nick tries to hotwire the car using his lighter, but accidentally causes the lighter to tip over and set the car on fire and explode. Nick takes his frustration out on the kids, but quickly calms down and apologizes afterward.

With the car now a heap of scrap metal, the trio tries to hitch a ride from Al Buck. Still thinking Nick is a kidnapper, Al leaves him behind and drives off. Nick hitches a ride from Ernst in a billboard truck. In Al's truck, the kids attack him, leading to a chase that ends in Vancouver, where Nick fights Al. During the fight, Kevin has an asthma attack and collapses. Nick rushes to his side and revives him. Witnessing the event, Suzanne believes trusting Nick was a mistake. After encouragement from Satchel, Nick goes to Suzanne's hotel to say goodbye to her and the kids. After Suzanne realizes how much Nick and the kids have grown to care for each other, Suzanne tells Nick that he is the one for her, and they kiss on New Year's Eve.

Cast
 Ice Cube as Nick Persons
 Aleisha Allen as Lindsey Kingston
 Philip Daniel Bolden as Kevin Kingston, Lindsey's younger brother
 Nia Long as Suzanne Kingston, Kevin and Lindsey's divorced mother
 Jay Mohr as Marty, Nick's best friend
 M. C. Gainey as Al Buck, a truck driver who mistakenly believes that Nick is a kidnapper.
 Tracy Morgan as the voice of a Satchel Paige Bobblehead, Nick's prized possession and confidante, who speaks to him through his conscience
 David Barclay as the Satchel Paige Bobblehead puppeteer
 C. Ernst Harth as Ernst, a truck driver who tries to help Nick save the kids from Big Al, but fails after Big Al crashes his truck
 Nichelle Nichols as Miss Mable, Kevin and Lindsey's elderly babysitter
 Sean Millington as Frank Kingston, Suzanne’s ex-husband and Kevin and Lindsey’s biological father who was divorced sometime before the events of the film, but he later started a new family.
 Henry Simmons as Carl, Suzanne's date who was scared off by Kevin and Lindsay
 Wilford Brimley as Himself (uncredited cameo)

Reception
Rotten Tomatoes, a review aggregator, reports that 12% of 116 surveyed critics gave Are We There Yet? a positive review; the average rating is 3.50/10. The site's critical consensus reads, "This supposed family comedy starring the usually blameless Ice Cube and Nia Long has provoked most critics to write, Is it over yet?" On Metacritic, the film has a score of 27 out of 100 based on 28 critics, indicating "generally unfavorable reviews". Audiences polled by CinemaScore gave the film an average grade of "B+" on an A+ to F scale.

Box office
The film opened at number one with a gross of $18.6 million in 2,709 theaters, averaging $6,856 per venue. The film's opening weekend made up 22.57% of its final domestic gross. In its second weekend, the film dropped to number two but lost just 12% of its audience, grossing a further $16.3 million, and raised the ten day total to $38.5 million. It closed on June 16, 2005, with a final gross of $97.9 million worldwide ($82.7 million in North America and $15.2 million internationally).

The film was released in the United Kingdom on February 17, 2005, and opened at number six within the first weekend. The next weekend, the film moved up one place, then down back to number six, before finally ending up at number 13 on March 25, 2005.

Awards and nominations

 BMI Music Film Award
 2005 Teen Choice Awards: Choice Movie – Comedy (nominated, lost to Napoleon Dynamite)
 2006 Kids' Choice Awards: Favorite Movie (nominated, lost to Harry Potter and the Goblet of Fire)

Television series

In June 2010, Are We There Yet? premiered on TBS. The show's executive producer and creator is Ice Cube, who created and starred in the film adaptation. All of the roles from the film series are recast. Terry Crews, who previously worked with Ice Cube in Friday After Next and Lottery Ticket, takes over the role of Nick and Essence Atkins, who was in Half & Half and Smart Guy, takes over Nia Long's role as Suzanne. The show ended after three seasons in March 2013. Ice Cube has a recurring role as Suzanne's brother, Terrence.

References

External links

 
 
 

2005 films
2005 comedy films
2000s comedy road movies
American Christmas comedy films
American comedy road movies
2000s English-language films
African-American comedy films
African-American films
Films about families
Films adapted into television shows
Films set in Portland, Oregon
Films set in Vancouver
Films shot in Vancouver
Films shot in Portland, Oregon
Films set around New Year
Columbia Pictures films
Cube Vision films
Revolution Studios films
Films scored by David Newman
Films directed by Brian Levant
Films produced by Ice Cube
American children's comedy films
2000s American films